The 2017–18 UAB Blazers basketball team represented the University of Alabama at Birmingham during the 2017–18 NCAA Division I men's basketball season. The Blazers, led by second-year head coach Robert Ehsan, played their home games at the Bartow Arena as members of Conference USA. They finished the season 20–13, 10–8 C-USA play to finish in sixth place. The defeated Florida Atlantic in the first round of the C-USA tournament before losing to Western Kentucky. Despite winning 20 games, they did not participate in a postseason tournament.

Previous season 
The Blazers finished the 2016–17 season 17–16, 9–9 in C-USA play to finish in a tie for seventh place. They defeated Charlotte in the first round of the C-USA tournament before losing to Louisiana Tech.

Offseason

Departures

Incoming transfers

Incoming recruits

Recruiting class of 2018

Roster

Schedule and results
 
|-
!colspan=9 style=|Exhibition

|-
!colspan=9 style=| Non-conference regular season

|-
!colspan=12 style=| Conference USA regular season

|-
!colspan=9 style=| Conference USA tournament

Source

References

UAB Blazers men's basketball seasons
UAB
UAB Blazers men's basketball
UAB Blazers men's basketball